Paul W. Broyles (February 3, 1896 – February 24, 1974) was an American businessman and politician.

Born on a farm near McLeansboro, Illinois, Broyles served in the United States Army during World War I. He lived in Mount Vernon, Illinois and owned a photography enlargement sales business. Broyles served in the Illinois House of Representatives from 1943 to 1945 and was a Republican. He then served in the Illinois Senate from 1945 to 1971.  In 1947, Broyles established the Seditious Activities Investigation Commission, known as the Broyles Commission, to investigate and suppress Communist activities in the state of Illinois.  J. B. Matthews, future chief investigator to the House Un-American Activities Committee, served as special consultant to the Commission.  The Commission's enquiries were mainly directed at the University of Chicago and Roosevelt College. Broyles died at St. Luke's Hospital in St. Louis, Missouri.

Notes

External links

1896 births
1974 deaths
People from McLeansboro, Illinois
People from Mount Vernon, Illinois
Military personnel from Illinois
Businesspeople from Illinois
Republican Party members of the Illinois House of Representatives
Republican Party Illinois state senators
American anti-communists
20th-century American politicians
20th-century American businesspeople
United States Army personnel of World War I